Ray Land (14 November 1930 – 14 May 2020) was an Australian sprinter. He competed in the men's 100 metres at the 1956 Summer Olympics.

References

External links
 

1930 births
2020 deaths
Athletes (track and field) at the 1956 Summer Olympics
Australian male sprinters
Olympic athletes of Australia
Place of birth missing